Ranu Tompe is a mountain lake located in Bromo Tengger Semeru National Park, East Java, Indonesia. Geographically, Ranu Tompe is isolated and far from human access. Ranu Tompe is only known from satellite images and maps of the area.

References

Lakes of East Java